Jacque Jules Garnier (25 November 1839 in Saint-Étienne – 8 March 1904 in Gorbio) was a French engineer and industrialist.

Biography 

Garnier studied at the Saint-Étienne School of Mines (1860). Upon leaving the School of Mines of Saint-Étienne , he worked for two years at the Steelworks of the Navy and the Railways, then carried out a geological study in Sardinia in 1862. He was sent to Nouméa as head of the mines department of New Caledonia in 1863. Until 1866 he traveled the island and discovered a new green nickel ore,  having a large weight percent of nickel oxide, which was named garnierite in his honor by his peers. This discovery was formalized at the Paris Academy of Sciences in 1876. He also undertook missions in Canada . He received the Legion of Honor at the age of 28.

In 1876, Jules Garnier filed a patent for the industrial exploitation of New Caledonian nickel and participated in the creation of a company (the future Société Le Nickel - SLN), by having the first nickel plant at Pointe-Chaleix in Nouméa. That same year, he filed a patent in February describing the principles and uses of ferronickel.

In the meantime, as commander of a battalion of volunteers, he took part in the Franco-Prussian War of 1870. He was involved in attacks on bridges, railroads, and so on. He experimented with one of his inventions, torpedoes (50 kg) fueled by flash cotton, with effects as devastating as they were useless in a war lost too quickly. Garnier participated in the defense of Dijon.

He led some reflections on urban transport in the capital, proposing construction of an underground train. Later, he did some research in the field both explosives (experienced during the conflict of 1871) and better use of steam (compound system, steam machine gun).

Several trips to North America and more specifically to Canada with his son Gilbert Garnier allow him to demonstrate his patents and processes. Since the nickel steel industry is developing, mining companies in Canada work with Jules Garnier because of his reputation. He was involved in the creation of entire plants as consulting engineer for the Canadian Copper Company (forerunner of the Inco mining group).

Engineer-inventor, Jules Garnier is also known for the importance and diversity of his writings. Beyond the "simple" publication of research results and/or various projects, Jules Garnier was also a writer. He published a very large number of articles in the fields of science and technology, but also in journals of geography. His bibliography consists of more than 30 references, including his travelogues, his reference book "Le Fer" (i.e. "Iron"), and several inventions in various fields. After 1870, he even became secretary of the Geographical Society of Paris.

Jules Garnier died in Gorbio on 8 March 1904. He is buried in the cemetery of Crêt de Roch in Saint-Étienne. Jules Garnier still remains for New Caledonia, a key character in the origin of its industrial development. A school there, as well as a street in Nouméa bear his name.

Publications and works 

 Voyage à la Nouvelle-Calédonie, 1867-1868, reéd. 1978, éd. du Cagou,
 Excursion autour de l'île de Tahiti, ed.  E. Martinet 1869
 Notes géologiques sur l'Océanie, les îles Tahiti et Rapa  Paris, ed. Dunod 1870
 Les Migrations Polynésiennes en Océanie d'après les faits naturels Paris, ed.  E. Martinet 1870
 Voyage autour du Monde : OCÉANIE les îles des pins, Loyalty et Tahiti Paris, ed. Plon 1871
 La Lithologie du fond des mers by M. Delesse, Report and Excerpts by M. Jules Garnier, 1872
 Dianémomètre with  M. Deprez ed. Imprimerie de J. Desoer, 1872
 Machines à percer, couper et abattre les roches, Emploi de la Nitroglycérine with Ernest Javal St Étienne, ed. Imprimerie de V° Théolier et C° 1891
 L'Or et le Diamant au Transvaal et au Cap, ed.  Librairie Polytechnique Baudry et Cie, 1896

References

External links

 Foréziens en Calédonie
 Site about Jules Garnier with extensive biographical details and documents (in French and English)

French engineers
French metallurgists
French industrialists
1839 births
1904 deaths